Jeremy Boot (born 1948) is a South Australian wildlife artist, known particularly for detailed, ornithologically accurate, portraits of birds.

Boot was born in Java and arrived in Australia in 1949. He is a self-taught artist

His work has been reproduced a great number of times on playing cards, calendars, notepads, china plates and other high quality media, including limited edition art prints.

Publications

 foreword by Sir Mark Oliphant.
 also marketed as Birds of Australia

References

20th-century Australian painters
Australian bird artists
Australian commercial artists
1948 births
Living people